Maddilapalem is an area of Visakhapatnam, in the Indian state of Andhra Pradesh. 

Maddilapalem was initially a small suburb outside of Visakhapatnam.

Economy 

Maddilapalem is one of the major commercial and residential suburbs of Visakhapatnam. Ashok Leyland Auto Manufactures and Jayabheri Maruthi Institutions are located there.

CMR Central is located at Maddilapalem Junction. It is one of the largest shopping malls in Visakhapatnam City.

Transport
Maddilapalem is home to one of the busiest transport hubs in Visakhapatnam. Visakhapatnam BRTS connects Maddilapalem to Asilmetta. 

Maddilapalem Junction is among the busiest in the city. The roads leading from the junction lead to Asilmetta, Dwaraka Nagar, and Madhurawada.  Maddilapalem is connected by the National Highway. 

APSRTC operates a bus depot and bus station. Buses are run by the state-owned APSRTC, and connect to all parts of Visakhapatnam.

Education

Maddilapalem is home to many educational institutions and commercial coaching and training centers. Andhra University College of Engineering and Dr. V. S. Krishna Govt. Degree & P.G College are situated there.

Amenities 
Kalabharathi Auditorium is in Pithapuram Colony.

References

Neighbourhoods in Visakhapatnam